Following is a list of Iota Phi Theta chapters, both collegiate and alumni. Iota Phi Theta is a historically African American fraternity founded in 1963 at Morgan State University in Maryland. Its chapters start as colonies and are assigned a Greek letter chapter designation after demonstrating viability for one year.

Collegiate chapters 
Following are the Iota Phi Theta collegiate chapters. Active chapters are indicated in bold. Inactive chapters are indicated in italic.

Notes

Alumni chapters 
Following are the alumni chapters of Iota Phi Theta. Active chapters are indicated in bold. Inactive chapters are shown in italic.

References 

Lists of chapters of United States student societies by society
African-American fraternities and sororities